Inclusive Skating is a charity that provides opportunities for skaters with additional needs. They cater to skaters of all levels, ranging from first-timers to recreational skaters, to elite competitive level athletes  and hold events on a global scale which utilise their own judging framework developed for judging skaters who have additional challenges.

Background 
Founded in 2011 as Impaired Skating, the charity renamed itself to Inclusive Skating following feedback from its members.

Inclusive Skating's main objective is the advancement of public participation in sport and the promotion of equality and diversity and the development and implementation of programming which fosters the inclusion of skaters with any form of impairment or disability. They offer events, competitions, seminars, workshops, and E-Learning resources for its skaters, coaches, parents, and volunteers.

The club structure has been officially recognised by the Scottish Parliament, where they are an active member of the Cross-Party Group on Sport.

Inclusive skating advocates for the inclusion of skating in the Paralympic Games.

Activities 
Since 2021 their courses have been endorsed by CIMSPA 
and they are also an approved activity provider (AAP) for The Duke of Edinburgh's Award for physical, skills, and volunteering.

Judging Framework
This Inclusive Skating judging framework is the first in the world for judging sports which takes into account all types of impairments. Currently, the framework facilitates the inclusion of skaters with conditions including physical disability, visual impairment, sensory challenges, autism, cerebral palsy, cystic fibrosis, genetic disorders and mental and behavioural impairments, among others. They also offers the option for skaters to compete via pre-recorded video, to accommodate for conditions which might impede upon an athlete's ability to compete live, such as anxiety.

Events 
Inclusive Skating holds educational events, workshops, seminars, and competitions. Competition events are held for all skating disciplines including: singles free-skating, pairs, ice dancing, solo ice dancing, figures, Synchronized skating, speed skating, inline skating, and off-ice competitive events. These competitions utilise the IS judging system which allows for fair competition between skaters with different disabilities using a compensation system based on the empirically researched Dr. Rondinelli Guides to the Evaluation of Permanent Impairment from the American Medical Association.

Prince Edward, president of the Sport and Recreation Alliance, was also a guest of honour at the Scottish Championship event in 2019.

Inclusive Skating's event format has been adopted by the International Skating Union.

Membership 
Inclusive Skating is a member of the following organisations:

 Scottish Sports Association
 Welsh Sports Association
 Northern Ireland Sports Forum
 Sport and Recreation Alliance
 Scottish Council for Voluntary Organisations
 Health and Social Care Alliance Scotland

References 

Organizations established in 2011
Ice skating